The following details notable events from the year 2009 in Azerbaijan. The Republic of Azerbaijan is the largest country in the Caucasus region located at the crossroads of Western Asia and Eastern Europe, it is bounded by the Caspian Sea to the east, Russia to the north, Georgia to the northwest, Armenia to the west, and Iran to the south. The exclave of Nakhchivan is bounded by Armenia to the north and east, Iran to the south and west, while having a short borderline with Turkey to the northwest.

Incumbents
 President: Ilham Aliyev
 Prime Minister: Artur Rasizade
 Speaker: Ogtay Asadov

Events

March 

 March 18 - 2009 Azerbaijani constitutional referendum

April
April 24 - The Cabinet of Ministers adopts the State Registration Rules of Joint-Base Airdromes.
April 27 - Due to 2009 swine flu pandemic Azerbaijan severed the import of animal husbandry goods from the United States and introduces the sanitary inspections at railroads and in Heydar Aliyev International Airport. All swine-breeding farmings were subjected to strict prophylactic control.
April 27 - A monument to Meshadi Azizbekov in Baku was dismantled. Another monument to Prokopius Dzhaparidze in the capital was removed permanently shortly after.
April 30 - Thirteen people were killed in Azerbaijan State Oil Academy shootings.

May
May 1 -  The state stamp maker Azermarka had issued postage stamps dedicated to the 15th anniversary of Azerbaijan’s cooperation with NATO.
May 2 -  Baku hosted the international scientific conference Conspectus to a New Thinking in Modern World initiated by Azerbaijan Association of Philosophy and Socio-Political Sciences.
May 6 - Azerbaijan State Philharmonic Hall marked the upcoming 200th birthdate of Frédéric Chopin.
May 15 - Baku hosted the 25th Rhythmic Gymnastics European Championships.
May 15 - Azerbaijan reached the Eurovision 2009 final.
May 22 - Israel’s El-Al Airlines Boeing-777 flying from Hong Kong to Tel Aviv made emergency landing in Baku. The engine problem was fixed and the plane continued its flight.

July
July 2 - The Heydar Aliyev Airport suspended its night schedule. The airport worked in a normal regime from 7 a.m. til 12 p.m.According to AZAL spokesman, this rule was established for the population to rest calmly at night time. He noted that the restrictions are not related to humanitarian, state, sanitarian and rescue flights, as well as to the flights that were caught in bad weather and that need to land urgently.

December 

 December 20 - Metro station of “Azadlig prospekti”  (“Liberty Avenue”) was put into operation.
 December 23 - Municipal elections were held in Azerbaijan.

Deaths
 February 13 – Bakhtiyar Vahabzadeh, Azerbaijani poet (born 1925)

References

 
Azerbaijan
2000s in Azerbaijan
Years of the 21st century in Azerbaijan
Azerbaijan
Azerbaijan